is a Japanese photojournalist based between New York and Japan. Her clientele consists of The New York Times, MSNBC, Le Monde, Stern and the New York magazine, among others. She won the Grand Prize in Editor and Publisher Magazine’s Ninth Annual Photos of the Year contest in 2008.  Fukada also won an Alicia Patterson Journalism Fellowship
 in 2010 to research and photograph Japan's disposable workers.

Career
Fukada majored in English literature and first worked in fashion advertising as an account executive. She borrowed a 35 mm SLR camera and started making photos.

References

External links
 Shiho Photojournalist Official site

Living people
Japanese photojournalists
Japanese women photographers
Year of birth missing (living people)
Women photojournalists